Giordano Colli (born 12 March 2000), is an Australian professional footballer who plays as a midfielder for Perth Glory. Giordano burst on to the scene after winning both the NPL Player of the Year and NPL Youth Player of the Year in his debut season for the Perth Glory NPL side. Giordano made his professional debut on 18 November 2020 against Shanghai Greenland Shenhua in the 2020 AFC Champions League.

Club career
Colli made his A-League debut for Perth Glory on 20 February 2022, coming off the bench against Brisbane Roar. On 3 April 2022, Colli scored his first professional goal with a free kick against Macarthur FC. On 23 October 2022, Colli scored his first A-League goal of the 2022/23 season against Central Coast Mariners. A week later on 30 October 2022, Colli scored a long-range effort against Adelaide United which was awarded the A-League Goal of the Week.

References

External links

</ref>

2000 births
Living people
Australian soccer players
Association football midfielders
Perth Glory FC players
National Premier Leagues players
Australian people of Italian descent